Beatrice Joan Caulfield (June 1, 1922 – June 18, 1991) was an American actress and model. After being discovered by Broadway producers, she began a stage career in 1943 that eventually led to signing as an actress with Paramount Pictures. In the opinion of Ephraim Katz in The Film Encyclopedia, published in 1979, "For several years she was among Paramount's top stars, radiating delicate femininity and demure beauty but rarely much else."

Early life and education
Beatrice Joan Caulfield was born on June 1, 1922 in West Orange, New Jersey. She attended Miss Beard's School in Orange, New Jersey. Caulfield was the niece of Genevieve Caulfield, who received the Presidential Medal of Freedom in 1963 for her work with blind children. During her teenage years, the family moved to New York City, where she eventually attended Columbia University. While at Columbia, Caulfield was active in many plays presented by the university's drama group. She also ventured into being a model with the Harry Conover Agency and "became a favorite with top-drawer fashion magazines", with her pictures appearing in many national magazines, including being on the cover of Life magazine's May 11, 1942, issue.

Career

Stage
Caulfield appeared on Broadway in Beat the Band in 1942. Directed by George Abbott it ran for 67 performances.

She had a great success portraying the troublesome teenager Corliss Archer in the 1943 hit comedy play Kiss and Tell, also under the direction of Abbott. It was a huge success, running for 956 performances until 1945. After a year in the role, Caulfield left the production to pursue offers from Hollywood and she was replaced by her sister Betty Caulfield. (Shirley Temple would play Caulfield's role in the 1945 film version of Kiss and Tell.) Paramount offered her a contract which gave her six months off a year to do a play.

Film
In July 1944 Paramount put Caulfield in a lead role in her first film: Miss Susie Slagle's (1946), a drama about medical students with Sonny Tufts and Veronica Lake.

The film was not released for a number of months due to a backlog of films. Made after but released earlier was Duffy's Tavern (1945), in which Caulfield had a cameo along with most of Paramount's talent roster.

Caulfield was Bob Hope's leading lady in Monsieur Beaucaire (1946), a popular comedy.

She was with Bing Crosby and Paul Draper in Blue Skies (1946). When original director Mark Sandrich died, Caulfield was pulled out of the film but Crosby insisted she stay. Eventually Draper was replaced with Fred Astaire. The result was a huge box office success. Caulfield waived her right to take time off to do stage work.

Caulfield was teamed with William Holden in Dear Ruth (1947), based on the hit play by Norman Krasna.

She was reunited with Crosby in Welcome Stranger (1947), another huge hit, and had a cameo in another all-star Paramount film, Variety Girl (1947).

One of Caulfield's most memorable film roles was when she was loaned out to Warner Bros. to appear in The Unsuspected (1947) with Claude Rains and Audrey Totter. Caulfield, taking over a role intended for Virginia Mayo, was billed over Rains.

Back at Paramount, Caulfield did The Sainted Sisters (1948) with Lake, playing roles intended for Betty Hutton and Diana Lynn.

Universal borrowed her for a film noir, Larceny (1948).

Paramount offered Caulfield $100,000 for 40 weeks work but she walked out on it to do Voice of the Turtle and Coquette on stage on the east coast. She said she did this because "I want to become a really great actress one day", and felt she needed the experience from stage. "Actresses in the movies spend most of their acting time with the hairdresser and the costumer." She returned to Paramount to do a sequel to Dear Ruth, Dear Wife (1948).

Caulfield went to Columbia to make a musical with Robert Cummings, The Petty Girl (1950) which she said she did to change from the "sweet young thing" parts she did at Paramount. She said she intended on staying in Hollywood.

She did a film for her husband's company, The Lady Says No (1951), releasing through United Artists.

Television
In the early 1950s, Caulfield began guest starring on television shows such as Robert Montgomery Presents, Lux Video Theatre, The Ford Television Theatre, Schlitz Playhouse and Hollywood Opening Night. She said she preferred working in television.

In 1953, she signed a contract with CBS. In the 1953 and 1954 seasons, she co-starred with Barry Nelson (the original James Bond, albeit on television) in the television version of My Favorite Husband, which was based upon the Lucille Ball radio series that evolved into I Love Lucy.

She had a supporting role in The Rains of Ranchipur (1955). In August 1955, she left her CBS contract to pursue feature work.

She was in Celebrity Playhouse, Schlitz Playhouse again, Screen Directors Playhouse,  and The Ford Television Theatre again.

Being the subject of an episode of This Is Your Life in 1957 brought Caulfield to the attention of television executives. In the words of a newspaper writer, "she photographed so beautifully that the show was hardly over before she was being approached for television appearances."

During the 1957–1958 season, Caulfield starred in Sally, a short-lived situation comedy, in the role of a traveling companion to an elderly widow, played by Marion Lorne. At midseason, Gale Gordon and Arte Johnson joined the cast.

When the series ended, Caulfield continued to guest-star on shows like Pursuit, General Electric Theater, Hong Kong, Cheyenne, Burke's Law, and My Three Sons. She did stage shows like I Am a Camera and had the occasional role in a feature, such as Cattle King (1963), Red Tomahawk (1967) and Buckskin (1967).

In 1967, she starred in the TV series The High Chaparral as Annalee Cannon in the pilot episode. She was murdered in the episode and that was the premise for the whole plot.

Later years
In the 1960s and 1970s, Caulfield was active in touring companies of plays, summer stock theater and dinner theater across the country. She guest starred in a 1966 episode of My Three Sons as Florence, a visiting former girlfriend who Steve could not remember ever knowing. She could be seen in the pilot for The Magician (1973), The Daring Dobermans (1973), The Hatfields and the McCoys (1975), The Space-Watch Murders (1975), Pony Express Rider (1976), and episodes of Baretta and Murder, She Wrote.

Personal life
In her 1988 autobiography As I Am, actress Patricia Neal backed allegations that singer Bing Crosby and Caulfield, who had appeared on-screen together, were engaged in a romantic affair when the singer was still married to Dixie Lee. In 1950, Caulfield married film producer Frank Ross, with whom she had a son, Caulfield Kevin Ross (born 1959). Ross produced and directed her 1951 film The Lady Says No, with David Niven taking second billing as her romantic interest. Caulfield was in a car accident in 1959. She separated from Ross, blaming the stress of working on Sally, then she found out she was pregnant. Ross and Caulfield were divorced in 1960.

In 1960, Caulfield married dentist Robert Peterson, with whom she had her second son, John Caulfield Peterson (born 1962). Her second marriage ended in divorce as well, in 1966.

Caulfield was a Republican who campaigned for Dwight Eisenhower during the 1952 presidential election.

Caulfield died from cancer, aged 69, at Cedars-Sinai Medical Center in Los Angeles and had lived in Beverly Hills, California. A.C. Lyles gave the eulogy.

Legacy
Caulfield has a star at 1500 Vine Street in the Television section of the Hollywood Walk of Fame. It was dedicated February 8, 1960.

Partial filmography

 Duffy's Tavern (1945) as Joan Caufield
 Miss Susie Slagle's (1946) as Margaretta Howe
 Monsieur Beaucaire (1946) as Mimi
 Blue Skies (1946) as Mary O'Hara
 Dear Ruth (1947) as Ruth Wilkins
 Welcome Stranger (1947) as Trudy Mason
 The Unsuspected (1947) as Matilda Frazier
 Variety Girl (1947) as Herself
 The Sainted Sisters (1948) as Jane Stanton
 Larceny (1948) as Deborah Owens Clark
 Dear Wife (1949) – Ruth Seacroft
 The Petty Girl (1950) as Prof. Victoria Braymore
 The Lady Says No (1951) as Dorinda Hatch
 The Rains of Ranchipur (1955) as Fern Simon
 Cattle King (1963) as Sharleen Travers
 Red Tomahawk (1967) as Dakota Lil McCoy
 Buckskin (1968) as Nora Johnson
 The Daring Dobermans (1973) as Claudia
 Pony Express Rider (1976) as Charlotte

Radio appearances

References

External links 
 
 
 Films of the Golden Age Biography
 Photographs and literature on Joan Caulfield

1922 births
1991 deaths
American film actresses
Female models from New Jersey
American television actresses
Columbia University alumni
People from West Orange, New Jersey
Deaths from cancer in California
Actresses from New Jersey
Paramount Pictures contract players
20th-century American actresses
Morristown-Beard School alumni
New Jersey Republicans
California Republicans